Claude Farell, real name Monika Burg, also known as Paulette Colar, Catherine Farell, Paulette Kolar and Paulette von Suchan (7 May 1918 – 17 March 2008) was an Austrian actress.

Partial filmography

Der Kleinstadtpoet (1940) - Zenzi
Immer nur du (1941)
Annelie (1941) - Ballettschülerin Helene
Two in a Big City (1942) - Gisela Meinhold
Lache Bajazzo (1943) - Giulia
Titanic (1943) - Manniküre Hedi
Meine Herren Söhne (1945) - Bettina von Wüstenhagen, Erzieheri
Wir sehn uns wieder (1945)
Die Schenke zur ewigen Liebe (1945) - Bärbel
The Sharks of Gibraltar (1947)
Les trafiquants de la mer (1947)
 The White Night (1948) - Cécilia
Dédée d'Anvers (1948) - La prostituée allemande
 The Secret of Mayerling (1949) - La comtesse Marie Larisch
Drame au Vel'd'Hiv''' (1949) - ClaraWedding Night In Paradise (1950) - Clarisse RödersBeware of Blondes (1950) - Suzanne WilsonWhite Shadows (1951) - HellaThe Woman's Angle (1952) - Delysia VeronovaPalace Hotel (1952) - Madame PerratAllô... je t'aime (1952) - Odette ChennevièreI Vitelloni (1953) - OlgaThe Night Without Morals (1953) - IsabellaClivia (1954) - CliviaHotel Adlon (1955) - Dolores SilvaCaptain Gallant of the Foreign Legion (1955, TV Series) - CharleneLove Is Just a Fairytale (1955) - Angela BrinkmannThe Three from the Filling Station (1955) - Irene von TuroffThe Road to Paradise (1956) - EdithSpy for Germany (1956) - Inge HagenDer schräge Otto (1957) - Gerti Korty (1958) - KiraMonsieur Suzuki (1960) - Françoise GirèneLe cercle vicieux (1960) - Dina (1960)Die Gejagten (1961) - Frau Reichle (1961) - Johanna MyliusThe Secret of the Black Widow (1963) - Mrs. AykeJack and Jenny (1963) - BarbaraLes Compagnons de Jéhu (1966, TV Series) - Mme TallienIm Banne des Unheimlichen (1968) - AdelaHugo der Weiberschreck (1969) - Elvira von RothenburgHow Did a Nice Girl Like You Get Into This Business? (1970) - Mrs. EpsteinVor Gericht seh'n wir uns wieder'' (1983, TV Movie) - (final film role)

References

External links
 
 Photographs and literature
 Alexey Gusev. The Nameless.  (in Russian) The article about Claude Farell.

1918 births
2008 deaths
Austrian stage actresses
Austrian film actresses
Actresses from Vienna
20th-century Austrian actresses